Thomas Eugene Martin (born January 12, 1947) is an American former Major League Baseball left fielder who appeared in nine games during the  season for the Washington Senators. Born in Americus, Georgia, he attended Dougherty Comprehensive High School in Albany, then was selected by Washington in the third round of the 1965 Major League Baseball draft.

Martin, then 21 years old, made the most of his very brief major league career. In his nine appearances in 1968, seven of them as a pinch hitter, he hit .364 with two singles, a double, and a home run in just 11 at bats. His home run was hit September 8 at Yankee Stadium against 1968 American League Rookie of the Year Stan Bahnsen. The solo blast accounted for Martin's lone run batted in.

Martin had a seven-year minor league career, then enjoyed success in Japan, where he played for six seasons ((–), five for the Chunichi Dragons, and one with the Yokohama Taiyo Whales. Over the course of his Japanese career, he hit 189 home runs (averaging over 30 per season) while batting .272.

Vietnam War veteran
Martin was drafted into the United States Army in 1965 and became a parachute rigger. In February 1967, he deployed to Vietnam during the Vietnam War.

References

External links
, or Retrosheet, or Pelota Binaria (Venezuelan Winter League)

1947 births
Living people
American expatriate baseball players in Japan
American expatriate baseball players in Mexico
United States Army personnel of the Vietnam War
Baseball players from Georgia (U.S. state)
Buffalo Bisons (minor league) players
Burlington Senators players
Cardenales de Lara players
American expatriate baseball players in Venezuela
Chunichi Dragons players
Denver Bears players
Eugene Emeralds players
Florida Instructional League Senators players
Hawaii Islanders players
Major League Baseball left fielders
Nippon Professional Baseball first basemen
Nippon Professional Baseball outfielders
People from Americus, Georgia
Petroleros de Poza Rica players
Pittsfield Senators players
Washington Senators (1961–1971) players
Wytheville Senators players
Yokohama Taiyō Whales players